Kono Kalakaua may refer to:

 Kono Kalakaua, a character in the original Hawaii Five-O television series (1968-1972)
 Kono Kalakaua, a character in the 2010 Hawaii Five-0  television series

See also
 Kono (disambiguation)
 Kalakaua